Elections to Omagh District Council were held on 5 May 2011, on the same day as the other Northern Irish local government elections. The election used three district electoral areas to elect a total of 21 councillors.

There was no change from the prior election.

Election results

Note: "Votes" are the first preference votes.

Districts summary

|- class="unsortable" align="centre"
!rowspan=2 align="left"|Ward
! % 
!Cllrs
! % 
!Cllrs
! %
!Cllrs
! %
!Cllrs
! % 
!Cllrs
!rowspan=2|TotalCllrs
|- class="unsortable" align="center"
!colspan=2 bgcolor="" | Sinn Féin
!colspan=2 bgcolor="" | DUP
!colspan=2 bgcolor="" | UUP
!colspan=2 bgcolor="" | SDLP
!colspan=2 bgcolor="white"| Others
|-
|align="left"|Mid Tyrone
|bgcolor="#008800"|56.5
|bgcolor="#008800"|4
|9.9
|1
|14.3
|1
|11.3
|1
|8.0
|0
|7
|-
|align="left"|Omagh Town
|bgcolor="#008800"|32.0
|bgcolor="#008800"|2
|17.6
|1
|15.3
|1
|13.0
|1
|22.1
|2
|7
|-
|align="left"|West Tyrone
|bgcolor="#008800"|48.6
|bgcolor="#008800"|4
|22.2
|1
|13.6
|1
|15.6
|1
|0.0
|0
|7
|-
|- class="unsortable" class="sortbottom" style="background:#C9C9C9"
|align="left"| Total
|46.9
|10
|16.4
|3
|14.3
|3
|13.3
|3
|9.1
|2
|21
|-
|}

District results

Mid Tyrone

2005: 4 x Sinn Féin, 1 x UUP, 1 x SDLP, 1 x DUP
2011: 4 x Sinn Féin, 1 x UUP, 1 x SDLP, 1 x DUP
2005-2011 Change: No change

Omagh Town

2005: 2 x Sinn Féin, 2 x Independent, 1 x DUP, 1 x UUP, 1 x SDLP
2011: 2 x Sinn Féin, 2 x Independent, 1 x DUP, 1 x UUP, 1 x SDLP
2005-2011 Change: No change

West Tyrone

2005: 4 x Sinn Féin, 1 x DUP, 1 x SDLP, 1 x UUP
2011: 4 x Sinn Féin, 1 x DUP, 1 x SDLP, 1 x UUP
2005-2011 Change: No change

References

Omagh District Council elections
Omagh